Ovidio de Jesús Vargas (6 February 1933 – 3 October 2011) was a Puerto Rican sprinter.

Career
His international career began it in the 1954 Central American and Caribbean Games in Mexico City, Mexico conquering their first medals, silver in the 4 x 400 meters, relay bronze in the 400 meters and fourth in the 400 m safety fences. His consecration in the CAC games, became in the 1959 Central American and Caribbean Games in Caracas, Venezuela, winning three gold medals and be with his partner, Manuel Rivera, the top figures of the delegation. Their gold medals came in the 400 meter hurdles with a time of 53.42, beating out the favorite, the Venezuelan Víctor Maldonado. His second gold was dramatic, overcome in the goal to its arch-rival, Iván Rodríguez in the 400 meters.

Ovidio De Jesus was one of 23 members of the first delegation of Puerto Rico in the 1955 Pan American Games held in Mexico City, Mexico by participating in the 400 meters and the relay of 4 x 400 meters that arrived in fourth place, losing the bronze medal at the finish line with Venezuela. Four years later, at the 1959 Pan American Games in Chicago, Illinois competing in the 400 and 400 m hurdles.

He competed at the 1956 Summer Olympics in Melbourne, Australia and in the 1960 Summer Olympics in Rome, Italy.

References

1933 births
2011 deaths
People from Río Grande, Puerto Rico
Athletes (track and field) at the 1956 Summer Olympics
Athletes (track and field) at the 1960 Summer Olympics
Puerto Rican male sprinters
Puerto Rican male hurdlers
Olympic track and field athletes of Puerto Rico
Athletes (track and field) at the 1955 Pan American Games
Athletes (track and field) at the 1959 Pan American Games
Pan American Games competitors for Puerto Rico
Central American and Caribbean Games gold medalists for Puerto Rico
Competitors at the 1954 Central American and Caribbean Games
Competitors at the 1959 Central American and Caribbean Games
Central American and Caribbean Games medalists in athletics